The Lee County Civic Center is a 7,800-seat multi-purpose arena in North Fort Myers, Florida, US. It opened in 1978.

It hosts local sporting events and concerts.

It has been the home of the Winternats since 1990, one of the oldest major Radio Controlled Car racing events in the world.

On November 15, 2008, WWE Raw superstar John Cena made a rare appearance/autograph signing and he scouted Florida Championship Wrestling talent.

References

External links
Official Website

1978 establishments in Florida
Indoor arenas in Florida
Music venues in Florida
Sports venues completed in 1978
Sports venues in Fort Myers, Florida